The Bloch MB.90 was the first all-metal French light aircraft. Only two aircraft were completed, making their first flights in 1932, though there were several variants.

Design and development

Though they were not a commercial success, the Bloch MB.90 and its variants were notable as the first French all-metal, meaning metal-framed, light aircraft. The MB.90 was a single engine, braced high wing design; the wing was in two parts, each with two I-section spars, constant chord and rounded tips. Their structure was duralumin and their covering fabric.
The rectangular cross-section fuselage of the MB.90 was a tubular steel structure, fabric covered apart from the cabin which had plywood floor and sides.  Sources disagree about the seating: a contemporary account described it as side-by-side but a recent review as tandem. Pairs of parallel bracing struts linked wing spars to the lower fuselage longerons. The fuselage narrowed rearwards to a conventional tail with a rectangular, round tipped tailplane mounted on the fuselage and a triangular fin with an unbalanced rudder which reached down to the keel.

Though the MB.90 was intended to be Renault powered, it was initially flown with a  de Havilland Gipsy III air-cooled four cylinder inverted engine. It had a fixed tailwheel undercarriage, with its main wheels on V-form split axles hinged on the lower fuselage longerons. At their outer ends, vertical shock absorbing struts reached up to the forward wing struts, strengthened at that point by two further struts to the lower and upper fuselage.

Two variants were displayed at the 1932 Paris Aero Show, both with  Renault 4Pei four cylinder inline engines.  These were designated the MB.91 and MB.92.  The former was shown incomplete and was never flown but it introduced some new features which were used on two further variants; it had wings struts that diverged slightly from below, a rounded fin and faired-in split-axles. Like the MB.90 it was a side-by side two-seater but the MB.92, otherwise similar, had tandem seats in a narrower fuselage.  Later a Pobjoy Niagara engine installation was offered for the MB.91. With the same modifications to fin, undercarriage and struts, one of the MB.90s became the MB.93, powered by a  de Havilland Gipsy Major I, a close relative of the Gipsy III with slightly increased capacity.

In 1933 Bloch tested a four-seat development, the Bloch MB.100, powered by a  Hispano-Suiza 5Q 5-cylinder radial engine, essentially a licence-built Wright R-540 Whirlwind.  The MB.100 had two rows of side-by-side seating.

Operational history
Both MB.90s were registered to compete in the third FAI International Tourist Plane Contest, Le Challenge de Tourisme International, held in Germany in August 1932 and were recorded as having Renault engines.  They failed to make the deadline and did not compete. The MB.92 remained on the French register until at least 1937.

Variants
MB.90 Initially flown with de Havilland Gipsy III engine in June 1932 but fitted with a  Renault 4Pei inverted inline engine for the 1932 Paris Aero Show. Parallel lift struts and triangular fin.
MB.91 Not flown; shown wingless at the 1932 Salon with the Renault engine. Lift struts converging somewhat to the fuselage, rounded fin and faired-in axles. A Pobjoy Niagara engine proposed in 1933.
MB.92 Grande Tourisme First flown 9 September 1932, with the Renault engine driving a metal propeller. Rounded fin, struts and faired undercarriage as MB.91. Seen at the 1932 Salon as a narrower, tandem seat machine. 
MB.93 One of the MB.90s modified to take a  de Havilland Gipsy Major I and the fin, struts and undercarriage of the MB.91.
MB.100 A four-seat development of the MB.90

Specifications (MB 90)

References

Bibliography

1930s French sport aircraft
Bloch aircraft
High-wing aircraft
Single-engined tractor aircraft
Aircraft first flown in 1932